James McLaren Ritchie  (1907–1981) was a New Zealand businessman and Anglican church administrator. He was born in Dunedin, New Zealand, in 1907, and was the grandson of John Macfarlane Ritchie.

In the 1979 New Year Honours, Ritchie was appointed a Commander of the Order of the British Empire, for services to business, educational, charitable and Anglican Church affairs.

References

1907 births
1981 deaths
New Zealand stock and station agents
New Zealand Anglicans
New Zealand Commanders of the Order of the British Empire
Businesspeople from Dunedin